Helicopsis conopsis is a species of air-breathing land snail, terrestrial pulmonate gastropod mollusk in the family Geomitridae, the hairy snails and their allies.

This species is endemic to Morocco.

References

External links
 https://www.researchgate.net/profile/Maria-Aparicio-3/publication/336150433_Systematics_and_distribution_of_Helicopsis_Xeroleuca_in_Morocco_Mollusca_Gastropoda_Helicidae/links/5d933291299bf10cff1cff21/Systematics-and-distribution-of-Helicopsis-Xeroleuca-in-Morocco-Mollusca-Gastropoda-Helicidae.pdf

Geomitridae
Endemic fauna of Morocco
Gastropods described in 1876
Taxonomy articles created by Polbot
Taxobox binomials not recognized by IUCN